Eudicrana is a genus of fungus gnats in the family Mycetophilidae. There are about 13 described species in Eudicrana.

Species
These 13 species belong to the genus Eudicrana:

 Eudicrana affinis Okada, 1938
 Eudicrana araucariae Matile, 1991
 Eudicrana basinerva Freeman, 1951
 Eudicrana claripennis Edwards, 1931
 Eudicrana elegans Lane, 1948
 Eudicrana monticola (Tonnoir, 1929)
 Eudicrana nicholsoni (Tonnoir, 1929)
 Eudicrana nigriceps (Lundstrom, 1909)
 Eudicrana obumbrata Loew, 1869
 Eudicrana pallida Freeman, 1951
 Eudicrana similis Freeman, 1951
 Eudicrana splendens Lane, 1948
 Eudicrana vittata Edwards, 1931

References

Further reading

 

Mycetophilidae
Articles created by Qbugbot
Bibionomorpha genera